Bloemhof is an agricultural town of about 2,000 inhabitants situated on the banks of the Vaal River in North West Province of South Africa.

History
It was founded in August 1864 when diamonds were discovered in the area. The town was established on the farm owned by John Barclay, who survived the HMS Birkenhead shipwreck in 1852. The place became known as Bloemhof (flower court) because of the lovely gardens that were planted by Barclay's daughter. In June 1869, the South African Republic's Volksraad created a new district called Bloemhof named after the town itself.  Currently Bloemhof has a variety of social milieus; it has a township called Boitumelong and former coloured residence called Coverdale. Salamat is also a small residence, formerly an Indian suburb, which is situated in this town.

Notable people
 Lieutenant-General Willem Louw (24 November 1920 – 4 July 1980) was a South African military commander. He joined the South African Army in the Special Service Battalion in 1938.

 Moosa Moolla (12 June 1934) TIC activist, member of COP National Secretariat, Treason trialist, 90 day detainee, MK and ANC member, editor of Spotlight, ANC Chief Representative in India, head of the ANC's Egypt and Middle East mission and the ANC representative on the Permanent Secretariat of the Afro-Asian Peoples Solidarity Organisation, recipient of the National Award, The Order of Luthuli, in Silver

 Juan-Philip Smith (born 30 March 1994) is a South African rugby union player for the Seattle Seawolves in Major League Rugby in the United States.

Monnapule Saleng Orlando Pirates super star was born and bred in Bloemhof (https://www.goal.com/en-za/news/saleng-i-should-have-played-for-kaizer-chiefs-orlando-pirates-star-reveals/blt720aae19431c2ed4)

Education
 Bloemhof Combined School
 Bloemhof primary School
 Boitumelong primary School
 Gaopalelwe Senior Secondary School
 Matlhajaneng Public Primary School
 Thamagane Primary School
 Thuto-Lore Secondary school
 Tshenolo Primary School
 Vaaloewer Combined School

Tourist attractions 
Bloemhof Dam
Bloemhof Dam Nature Reserve
Sandveld Nature Reserve
SA Lombard Nature Reserve

References

1864 in South Africa
Populated places founded by Afrikaners
Populated places in the Lekwa-Teemane Local Municipality
Populated places established in 1864